Moréac is a commune in the Morbihan department of Brittany in north-western France. Inhabitants of Moréac are called in French Moréacois.

Geography
The Ruisseau de Kerropert forms part of the commune's eastern border, then flows into the Ével, which forms its northern border.

Breton language
In 2008, there was 22,12% of the children attended the bilingual schools in primary education.

See also
Communes of the Morbihan department

References

External links

Official website 

 Mayors of Morbihan Association 

Communes of Morbihan